Mister Brau is a Brazilian musical comedy television series created by Jorge Furtado that originally aired from 22 September 2015 to 12 June 2018, on Rede Globo. The series aired over four seasons with a total of 54 episodes and 3 specials. The series centers on the two leads: Lázaro Ramos and Taís Araújo.

Premise
The plot revolves around a popular singer, Mr. Brau (Lázaro Ramos) and his wife Michele (Taís Araújo), a businesswoman and his choreographer. Michelle alludes to the fact that, "behind a great man has a great woman".

Mister Brau and Michele also value what is priceless: friendship. He remains faithful to Lima (Luis Miranda), his partner and adviser since the beginning of his career, and Michele relies on Gomes (Kiko Mascarenhas), her advisor, butler and personal advisor.

Cast
 Lázaro Ramos as Mister (Mr.) Brau / Braulio
 Taís Araújo as Michele Maria Brau
 Fernanda de Freitas as Andréia Tolledo de Menezes
 George Sauma as Henrique Tolledo de Menezes
 Luís Miranda as Lima
 Kiko Mascarenhas as Fernando Gomes
 Cláudia Missura as Catarina
 Marcelo Flores as Lieutenant Marques
 Leonardo Lima as Egídio Brau
 Brunna Oliveira as Lia Brau	
 Sérgio Rufino as Carlito Brau
 Fernanda Montenegro as Mrs. Rosita Gomes

References

External links
 Official website

2015 Brazilian television series debuts
Brazilian comedy television series
Portuguese-language television shows
Rede Globo original programming
2018 Brazilian television series endings